Mordellistena reichei is a species of beetle in the genus Mordellistena of the family Mordellidae. It was described by Emery in 1876.

References

Beetles described in 1876
reichei